Pete Peña Gallego (born December 2, 1961) is an American lawyer and politician who served as the U.S. representative for Texas's 23rd congressional district from 2013 to 2015. A member of the Democratic Party, he previously served as a member of the Texas House of Representatives from the 68th district (74th district from 1993) beginning in 1991.

Gallego defeated freshman incumbent Quico Canseco of San Antonio for Texas's 23rd congressional district seat in the November 6, 2012, general election. Canseco conceded the race on November 9. Gallego ran for re-election in 2014, in what the Texas Tribune called the "only obviously competitive November congressional race" in Texas. He was defeated by challenger Republican Will Hurd on November 4, 2014. In 2016 he ran for Congress once more in the 23rd district, losing to Hurd a second time. In 2018, Gallego ran in a special election for the Texas State Senate District 19, losing to Republican Pete Flores.

Early career
After graduating from law school, Gallego became an assistant in the office of the state attorney general, before he returned to his hometown of Alpine to become a prosecutor. He was also an attorney at the law firm Brown McCarroll LLP, with an office in Austin.

State legislature
Elected to the Texas House from District 74 in 1990, Gallego was the first Hispanic to represent this vast border district. In 1991, he became the first freshman member and the first ethnic minority member ever elected as chair of the House Democratic Caucus, a post he held until January 2001.

In the Texas House, Gallego served on the board of directors of the National Association of Latino Elected Officials (NALEO), and four terms as Chairman of the Mexican American Legislative Caucus (MALC), a caucus of Texas representatives who are of Mexican-American descent or who serve a significant Mexican-American constituency. In 2008, Trey Martinez Fischer replaced Gallego as Chairman of MALC.

Gallego's state legislative career included chairmanships of the General Investigating Committee and several select and subcommittees. He has also served as a member of the Committees on Appropriations, Calendars, Criminal Jurisprudence, Higher Education, and Elections.

In 2008, Gallego narrowly missed being elected Speaker of the Texas House.

U.S. House of Representatives

Elections
2012

Gallego announced his candidacy for the 23rd district in September 2011. His state house district was virtually coextensive with the central portion of the congressional district; indeed, he had represented almost all of the central portion of the congressional district at one time or another during his two decades in the state legislature.

He finished second in the Democratic primary, behind former congressman Ciro Rodriguez, who had received Bill Clinton's endorsement. He then defeated Rodriguez in the July 31 runoff election by a margin of 55-45 percent. During the course of his campaign, Gallego overhauled his campaign staff four times.

In the general election, Gallego defeated Canseco with 50 percent of the vote to Canseco's 46 percent, a margin of 9,200 votes. While Gallego lost in Bexar County, home to more than half the district's population, he dominated his former state house district. The campaign between Gallego and Canseco was contentious, with Gallego alleging that Canseco was a "right-wing extremist," and Canseco calling Gallego a "radical environmentalist."

Gallego was supported by the Blue Dog Coalition.

2014

Gallego ran for re-election in 2014. Facing no opposition from his own party, he won the Democratic primary on March 4, 2014. He faced Republican Will Hurd, an African American, in the general election. Gallego was a member of the Democratic Congressional Campaign Committee's Frontline Program. The program is designed to help protect vulnerable Democratic incumbents. He lost his bid for re-election to Republican Will Hurd by less than 2,500 votes.

2018

In July 2017, Gallego tested the waters as a potential 2018 candidate once more against Hurd. Reapportionment of the district could play a major role as to whether Gallego decided to enter the race. At least two other Democrats also considered running for their party nomination: Judith Canales, a former officer of the United States Department of Housing and Urban Development from Eagle Pass, and Jay Hulings, a graduate of Harvard Law School and an assistant U.S. attorney in San Antonio. On September 1, Gallego announced that he would not run in the 23rd district.

Committee assignments
Committee on Agriculture
Subcommittee on General Farm Commodities and Risk Management
Subcommittee on Livestock, Rural Development, and Credit
Committee on Armed Services
Subcommittee on Tactical Air and Land Forces
Subcommittee on Readiness

Texas State Senate 
In June 2018, a special election was triggered in Texas State Senate District 19 after incumbent Carlos Uresti resigned. After an initial eight-way race and election on July 31, in which no candidate received 50% of the vote, a runoff election was set between the top two candidates, Gallego and Republican Pete Flores. On September 18, Gallego was defeated in the runoff election; Flores received 53% of the vote, while Gallego received 47%.

Political positions

Healthcare
Gallego opposes repeal of the Affordable Care Act and voted against repeal in May 2013. Gallego's support for the Affordable Care Act has been attacked in advertisements by the Libre Initiative, a conservative Hispanic outreach group.

Gallego opposes a Medicare voucher system and says that he supports Medicaid expansion and prescription drug negotiations.

Abortion
Gallego supported an abortion law allowing minors to get an abortion with parental consent. Under the legislation a minor would have been able to bypass the requirement for parental consent by petitioning a judge.

Immigration
Gallego has said that border security and immigration reform are two separate issues. He advocates improved "worker accountability programs, using border security as an economic tool and aiding the current 11 million undocumented individuals in a path to citizenship", writing with several others in an opinion piece in the El Paso Times that, "We can no longer delay immigration reform. The time to move forward is now." Gallego has said "Most people don't really care where the idea comes from. They want action, they want something to happen, and they're tired of the prolonged conversation." Gallego has expressed support for President Obama's immigration policies. He supports the DREAM Act.

In 2014, Gallego invited Speaker of the House John Boehner to the Southern Border to view the humanitarian crisis and discuss the matter with local border patrol agents and community members.

Energy
Gallego has been supported by the Sierra Club and the League of Conservation Voters. According to Texas Climate News, Gallego's 2012 congressional victory "earned the celebratory attention of climate-action advocates." Gallego has voiced support for renewable and clean energy sources. The Sierra Club called Gallego a "clean energy champion." Mother Jones included Gallego in a list of the "Top Five Climate Hawks" who were elected to office in November 2012.

Sul Ross State

In May 2020 Chancellor Brian McCall announced Gallego as the sole finalist for becoming the 13th president of Sul Ross State (SRSU). In June the regents confirmed him as the next president. He will be the first president to be a SRSU grad. He will face challenges of declining enrollment and naming controversy as the university he now heads is named for a Confederate General.

Personal life
Born in Alpine, Gallego graduated from Sul Ross State University in 1982 with a bachelor's degree in political science. In 1985, he earned a J.D. from the University of Texas School of Law in Austin.

In 2012, Gallego began drawing pension benefits from the State of Texas in addition to his annual congressional salary of $174,000.

See also

Hispanics in the United States
Mexican-Americans
List of Hispanic and Latino Americans in the United States Congress

References

External links
 Campaign website
 
 

1961 births
Living people
Democratic Party members of the Texas House of Representatives
Hispanic and Latino American members of the United States Congress
Hispanic and Latino American state legislators in Texas
People from Alpine, Texas
Sul Ross State University alumni
University of Texas School of Law alumni
Democratic Party members of the United States House of Representatives from Texas
21st-century American politicians
20th-century American politicians
Candidates in the 2016 United States elections